Urosalpinx cymioides is an extinct species of sea snail, a marine gastropod mollusk in the family Muricidae, the murex snails or rock snails.

Description

Distribution
Fossils were found in Pliocene and Pleistocene strata of Ecuador.

References

External links
 

cymioides
Gastropods described in 1941
Pliocene gastropods
Pleistocene gastropods